The Rokeach Value Survey (RVS) is a values classification instrument. Developed by social psychologist Milton Rokeach, the instrument is designed for rank-order scaling of 36 values, including  18 terminal and 18 instrumental values. The task for participants in the survey is to arrange the 18 terminal values, followed by the 18 instrumental values, into an order "of importance to YOU, as guiding principles in YOUR life".

The RVS has been studied in the context of personality psychology, behavior, marketing, social structure and cross-cultural studies. There have been a number of attempts to reduce the 18 instrumental values and 18 terminal values into a set of underlying factors, but without consistent success. Attempts have included that by Feather and Peay in 1975 and by Charles Johnston in 1995.

Rokeach's RVS is based on a 1968 volume (Beliefs, Attitudes, and Values) which presented the philosophical basis for the association of fundamental values with beliefs and attitudes. His value system was instrumentalised into the Rokeach Value Survey in his 1973 book The Nature of Human Values.

Terminal Values
Terminal Values refer to desirable end-states of existence. These are the goals that a person would like to achieve during his or her lifetime. These values vary among different groups of people in different cultures.

The terminal values in RVS are: 

True Friendship
Mature Love
Self-Respect
Happiness
Inner Harmony
Equality
Freedom
Pleasure
Social Recognition
Wisdom
Salvation
Family Security
National Security
A Sense of Accomplishment
A World of Beauty
A World at Peace
A Comfortable Life
An Exciting Life

Instrumental Values
Instrumental Values refer to preferable modes of behavior. These are preferable modes of behavior, or means of achieving the terminal values.

The Instrumental Values are: 

Cheerfulness
Ambition
Love
Cleanliness
Self-Control
Capability
Courage
Politeness
Honesty
Imagination
Independence
Intellect
Broad-Mindedness
Logic
Obedience
Helpfulness
Responsibility
Forgiveness

Criticisms
Keith Gibbins and Iain Walker question whether the values included in the RVS are the ones that are critical. They argue that Rokeach, who started with several hundred values suggested by 130 individuals and a literature review, had inadequate criteria for reducing the values. They also questioned the validity of Rokeach's measures, suggesting that when people rank the values they may not even be ranking the same referents.

See also
 Theory of Basic Human Values
 Values scale
 World Values Survey
 Inglehart–Welzel cultural map of the world

References 

Value (ethics)